Wu Yibing (born 14 October 1999) is a Chinese professional tennis player. He has been ranked as high as world No. 58 by the Association of Tennis Professionals (ATP), which he first achieved on 13 February 2023, making him the highest-ranked male Chinese player in history. He also a career-high doubles ranking of No. 295, achieved on 23 April 2018. Wu is the first Chinese man in the Open Era to reach, and to win, an ATP Tour-level singles final, doing so at the 2023 Dallas Open.

Wu became the world No. 1 in the ITF Junior Circuit ranking after winning the boys' singles title at the 2017 US Open.

Wu represented China at the 2017 Davis Cup, where he has a W/L record of 1–0. He defeated Jason Jung in his first Davis Cup match.

Juniors
In December 2016, Wu reached the final of the 2016 Orange Bowl, a Grade A junior event, losing to Miomir Kecmanović in the final.

In 2017, Wu reached the semifinals in both boys' singles and doubles at the Australian Open, and won both the boys' singles and doubles champions (with Chinese Taipei's Hsu Yu-hsiou) at the US Open, thus became the first Chinese male to win a Grand Slam title.

Professional career

2017–2018: ATP and Masters debuts, first ATP win
In September 2017 he made his ATP debut at the 2017 Chengdu Open as a wildcard.
In October 2017 he made his Masters debut at the Shanghai Masters as a wildcard.

In 2018, Wu recorded his first ATP win against Li Zhe at the Shanghai Masters. In the second round he won the first set against Kei Nishikori.

2019–2021: Hiatus due to injury
He did not compete from March 2019 to December 2021 due to injury.

2022: Historic major debut & third round, Meteoric rise to top 125 
In 2022, he won three Challenger titles in the United States, including back-to-back trophy runs in July in Rome, Georgia and Indianapolis. As a result, he reached the top 200 at a career-high of No. 174, on 25 July 2022.  His four career total Challenger titles made him the most decorated Chinese player in the circuit’s history.

At the US Open he qualified to make his Grand Slam debut. He became the first male Chinese in the Open Era to qualify at the US Open, winning his last qualifying match before Zhang Zhizhen also won his last match later in the same day. Wu won his first round match against 31st seed Nikoloz Basilashvili, becoming the first male Chinese player to win a US Open match in the Open era and a Grand Slam match in 63 years since Mei Fu Chi at Wimbledon 1959. He beat fellow qualifier Nuno Borges in five sets in the second round to become the first Chinese male player to reach the third round of any Grand Slam event since Kho Sin-Kie in 1946 Wimbledon. He also became the first Chinese man ever to reach the third round in the tournament history (since 1881). As a result, he moved 43 positions up to world No. 131 in the rankings on 12 September 2022. He then lost to world No. 1, Daniil Medvedev, in the third round.

He finished his year ranked No. 119, 1000 spots higher than his ranking at the end of the 2021 season.

2023: Australian Open debut, Historic title & Top 10 win & Top 60 debut, Chinese No. 1
Wu started his season playing the first Adelaide International, where, in qualifying, he defeated Ugo Humbert but lost to Alexei Popyrin. He received a wildcard into the 2023 Australian Open, where he lost to Corentin Moutet in the first round.

Following a final showing in the Cleveland Challenger, Wu made his debut in the top 100 at world No. 97 on 6 February 2023, becoming the second Chinese male player to do so after Zhang Zhizhen four months earlier.

In Dallas, Wu defeated Michael Mmoh in the first round, then claimed the biggest win of his career by defeating third seed Denis Shapovalov in the second round to reach his first ATP Tour-level quarterfinal. He then beat Adrian Mannarino to become the first Chinese player since Pan Bing in 1995 to reach an ATP Tour level semifinal, and only the second ever player from China to do so. By defeating top seed and world No. 8 Taylor Fritz in the semifinals, he became the first Chinese male ever to defeat a top 10 ranked player and to make an ATP Tour level final in the Open Era.  He went one step further to win the title defeating John Isner after saving four championship points in the match, and become the first Chinese man in the Open Era to win an ATP title. In doing so, he became the highest-ranked Chinese player in the history of the ATP Rankings, and overtook Zhang to become the first Chinese player to enter the top 60 on 13 February 2023. He received a wildcard for the 2023 BNP Paribas Open where he defeated Jaume Munar following a controversial call from the empire on match point.

Performance timelines

Singles
Current through the 2023 Dallas Open.

Doubles

ATP career finals

Singles: 1 (1 title)

Challengers and Futures finals

Singles: 9 (6–3)

Doubles: 1 (0–1)

Junior Grand Slam finals

Singles: 1 (title)

Doubles: 1 (title)

Record against top 10 players

Wu's record against players who have been ranked in the top 10, with those who are active in boldface. Only ATP Tour main draw matches and Davis Cup matches are considered:

Wins over top 10 players
Wu has a  record against players who were, at the time the match was played, ranked in the top 10.

References

External links

 
 
 

1999 births
Living people
Chinese male tennis players
Sportspeople from Hangzhou
US Open (tennis) junior champions
Tennis players at the 2018 Asian Games
Medalists at the 2018 Asian Games
Asian Games medalists in tennis
Asian Games silver medalists for China
Tennis players from Zhejiang
Grand Slam (tennis) champions in boys' singles
Grand Slam (tennis) champions in boys' doubles
21st-century Chinese people